John Douglas Arnold (born 1974) is an American philanthropist, former Enron executive and founder of Arnold Ventures LLC, formerly the Laura and John Arnold Foundation. In 2007, Arnold became the youngest billionaire in the U.S. His firm, Centaurus Advisors, LLC, was a Houston-based hedge fund specializing in trading energy products that closed in 2012.  He now focuses on philanthropy through Arnold Ventures LLC.  Arnold is a board member of Breakthrough Energy Ventures.

Early life 
Arnold was raised in Dallas, Texas, and he was the younger of two sons. His mother later would work as an accountant at Centaurus. His father was a lawyer and died when Arnold was 18. At 14, he started his first company selling collectible sports cards called Blue Chip Cards.

A 1995 graduate of Vanderbilt University, he completed a degree in mathematics and economics in three years. He is a member of Lambda Chi Alpha.

Career
After college, he began his career at Enron as an oil analyst, but soon was promoted to assistant trader. In 1996, a year after starting at Enron, he moved to oversee the trading of natural gas derivatives at the Natural Gas Desk upon the departure of Jeff Bussan. Using their new Internet-based trading network, EnronOnline,  he is credited with making three quarters of a billion dollars for Enron in 2001 and was rewarded with the largest bonus in Enron history, some $8 million.  His former colleagues dubbed him "king of natural gas." When Enron collapsed, he was not accused of any wrongdoing.

He then founded Centaurus, a hedge fund, with his previous year's bonus in 2002.  He was widely quoted for his viewpoints on the industry by a government commission.

During the collapse of Amaranth Advisors, Centaurus is widely credited as being one of the major players on the other side of their position,  returning as much as 150% in 2005. August 2008, Centaurus acquired around 10% of the shares of National Coal Corporation (NCOC).

In 2009, Arnold gave a public speech to the U.S. Commodity Futures Trading Commission (CFTC), in which he opposed limits on financially settled trading positions but supported limits in the physical energy futures as they near expiration. Arnold announced his retirement from running the hedge fund on May 2, 2012.

Other interests 
In 2019, Arnold became the chairman of Houston's 2026 bid for the FIFA World Cup.

Philanthropy

Arnold started donating to the Knowledge Is Power Program (KIPP) in 2004 with a gift of $30,000 which was then based in Houston, and two years later he and his wife pledged $10 million to help KIPP expand to other cities.  Other multi-million gifts followed to other education programs, for example to Washington, D.C. city schools for merit pay, to Teach for America, and to StudentsFirst. Arnold has also given to The City Fund, an organization focused on growing the number of charter schools in the USA, and its political arm, Public School Allies.

The Laura and John Arnold Foundation was a private foundation founded by Arnold and his wife Laura. The organization was founded in 2010. In 2008, the Arnolds were original signatories of the Giving Pledge, a pledge by some high-net-worth individuals to donate the majority of their income to philanthropic causes during their lifetimes. From 2010-2013, the Arnolds were heavily involved in the Innocence Project which led to their interest in criminal reform. The Foundation is focused on evidence-backed giving for systematic change.

In 2013, the Arnolds donated $10 million as a private donation to the National Head Start Association after the United States federal government shutdown of 2013 had closed the pre-K Head Start programs.

In October 2018, it was reported that Arnold had spent more than $100 million in health-care related grants since 2014, with a particular focus on reducing pharmaceutical drug costs. 
Arnold funds Institute for Clinical and Economic Review (ICER), a nonprofit that created a formula to price drugs. Those who support ICER’s formula believe it could lower prices while critics argue that the formula is discriminator toward the elderly and those with disabilities or rare diseases. Arnold also has been an influential supporter of Democrats’ efforts to pass a drug-price reform bill.

In 2019, the organization was transformed into a limited-liability company composed of the former foundation, a donor-advised fund, and the Action Now Initiative advocacy organization, effectively combining philanthropy, research, policy, and advocacy efforts. The new entity is known as Arnold Ventures LLC with the charter "to remove barriers between data and decisive action, working swiftly across the policy-change spectrum."

In 2019, Arnold spoke out against donor-advised funds (DAF), criticizing them for delaying charitable giving and promoting giving to institutions that are less likely to need the money.  He proposed that foundations and DAFs should spend at least 7% annually, which would result in billions of dollars more being given to charities, and that DAFs should be legally held to an annual minimum distribution.

In 2020, Arnold was one of ten billionaires who had given away at least 20% of their wealth.

Controversies
Arnold Ventures LLC has invited criticism with its involvement in many controversial areas. They are on record as agreeing with some of the critiques and focus on partnering with organizations to maximize their impact without undue influence. The former foundation was sued over a pre-trial web tool by the family of a victim who was murdered, but the District Court and a U.S. Appellate Court dismissed the complaint.

Arnold Ventures' 2020 grant to trial aerial surveillance hardware by the Baltimore Police Department was subject to legal challenges but in November 2020, a federal appeals court ruled that the program was constitutional and did not invade the rights and privacy of city residents.

Arnold’s foundation, Arnold Ventures, created a Public Safety Assessment which gave recently arrested individuals a score to determine their flight risk and potential bail. The NAACP and ACLU have criticized the Arnold PSA because they believe risk assessment tools actually increased the number of prisoners under the guise of criminal justice reform.

John received an $8 million dollar bonus from Enron just before the company filed for bankruptcy. It was the largest cash bonus ever distributed by the company. Arnold was described as “unapologetic” for his success in Enron’s final days. Arnold was not criminally charged with any wrongdoing at Enron, but he was named in a bankruptcy lawsuit by other Enron staff.

Arnold has been accused of pushing for pension reform in response to a lawsuit the California state pension system, CalPERS, filed against Enron. Through his foundation, Arnold has aggressively promoted pension reform in the state of California based on a study his foundation conducted with Pew that failed to mention that Enron or the overall financial crisis contributed to the shortfall.

John Arnold and his brother Matthew tore down historical homes in the River Oaks neighborhood of Houston which led to criticism by architectural conservationists.

Personal life 
Arnold is married to Laura Elena (Muñoz) Arnold. She is co-founder of Arnold Ventures LLC. She is a graduate of Harvard College, Yale Law School, and has a Master of Philosophy degree in European Studies from the University of Cambridge. She was formerly a mergers-and acquisitions attorney in Houston, Texas, and an oil company executive. Laura Arnold has served on the boards of the Innocence Project and the REFORM alliance.  They have three children.

References

External links
Arnold Ventures Website

1974 births
American billionaires
American commodities traders
American financiers
American hedge fund managers
American investors
American money managers
Businesspeople from Texas
Giving Pledgers
21st-century philanthropists
Living people
Businesspeople from Houston
Vanderbilt University alumni
Hillcrest High School (Dallas) alumni
Date of birth missing (living people)
Texas Democrats